The Hudsonian whimbrel (Numenius hudsonicus) is a wader in the large family Scolopacidae. It is one of the most widespread of the curlews, breeding across much of subarctic North America. This species and the Eurasian whimbrel have recently been split, although some taxonomic authorities still consider them to be conspecific.

The whimbrel is a migratory bird, wintering on coasts in southern North America and South America. It is also a coastal bird during migration. It is fairly gregarious outside the breeding season.

In the mangroves of Colombia, whimbrel roost sites are located in close proximity to feeding territories and away from potential sources of mainland predators, but not away from areas of human disturbance.

Description 
This is a fairly large wader, though mid-sized as a member of the curlew genus. The English name is imitative of the bird's call. The genus name Numenius is from Ancient Greek noumenios, a bird mentioned by Hesychius. It is associated with the curlews because it appears to be derived from neos, "new" and mene "moon", referring to the crescent-shaped bill. 

It is mainly greyish brown, with a rump pattern uniform with upperparts, and a long curved bill (longest in the adult female) with a kink rather than a smooth curve. It is generally wary.

The usual call is a rippling whistle, prolonged into a trill for the song.

The only similar common species over most of this bird's range are larger curlews. The whimbrel is smaller, has a shorter, decurved bill and has a central crown stripe and strong supercilia.

Subspecies 
There are 2 subspecies:

 Numenius hudsonicus rufiventris – Vigors, 1829: found in Alaska and northwestern Canada
 Numenius hudsonicus hudsonicus – Latham, 1790: (Hudsonian curlew) found in Hudson Bay area to northeastern Canada

Ecology 
This species feeds by probing soft mud for small invertebrates and by picking small crabs and similar prey off the surface. Before migration, berries become an important part of their diet. 

The nest is a bare scrape on tundra or Arctic moorland. Three to five eggs are laid. Adults are very defensive of nesting area and will even attack humans who come too close.

Near the end of the 19th century, hunting on their migration routes took a heavy toll on this bird's numbers; the population has since recovered.

References

Hudsonian whimbrel
Birds of Canada
Birds of Hispaniola
Birds of the Dominican Republic
Hudsonian whimbrel
Hudsonian whimbrel